The A89 autoroute is an autoroute in central France.  It is known as the La Transeuropéenne.  It connects Bordeaux (from Libourne) and Lyon (at Limonest) via Clermont-Ferrand. Its total length is 544 km (338 mi).

The project started in 1991 and was completed in 2018. It is composed of a new road construction and the re-use of a large part of the A72 built in the 1980s. The autoroute has taken the number of the national road it runs along, the N89.

Of the 544 kilometers in service: 167 km is between Libourne and Brive, 175 km between Saint-Germain-les-Vergnes and Combronde and 143 km between Clermont-Ferrand and Limonest. It is a concession of the Autoroutes du Sud de la France with the exception of the last section, 5 km between La Tour-de-Salvagny and Limonest was conceded to Autoroutes Paris-Rhin-Rhône.

In order to ensure the continuity of the numbers, following the opening of the section between the Saint-Julien-Sancy interchange and the Combronde junction in early 2006, the common core of the A71 motorway now bears both names (A71-A89), while the A710 and A72 autoroutes between Clermont-Ferrand and Balbigny, have been renamed the A89.

History
This transversal autoroute was intended as a powerful tool to open up the center of France, previously connected only to Paris, and a faster link between the second and sixth largest urban areas of France, that of Lyon and Bordeaux. Its commercial name is therefore La Transeuropéenne. It is also nicknamed the Autoroute des Présidents because it crosses the fiefdoms of several French Presidents, Valéry Giscard d'Estaing, Jacques Chirac and Francois Hollande, and it passes close to that of Georges Pompidou. Because of the environmental sensitivity of the Parc naturel régional des volcans d'Auvergne especially the visual impact of such work, it was chosen not to cross the Chaîne des Puys in the middle. As it approached the area, the autoroute heads north-east to get around the volcanoes, depriving Clermont-Ferrand of direct access to the autoroute from the west.

Open sections
The A89 motorway is divided into several sections:

 Libourne - Périgueux - Thenon - Terrasson-Lavilledieu - Brive;
 Saint-Germain-les-Vergnes - Tulle - Ussel - Saint-Julien-Puy-Lavèze - Combronde;
 Combronde - Clermont-Ferrand: common link (double numbered) by the A71;
 Clermont-Ferrand - Thiers - Balbigny (formerly A72, renamed A89 in 2006);
 Balbigny - The Tour-de-Salvagny.

The section of Arveyres at Saint-Julien-Puy-Lavèze, 288 km long, was declared a public utility on 10 January 1996. The section between Peyrignac and Cublac was also on 12 July 2005.

Section from Balbigny to La Tour-de-Salvagny
Work began on 28 June 2008 with the digging of the first 3.9 km tunnel between Violay (Loire) and Joux (Rhône). From a distance of 49.5 km, including 31.5 km in the Loire, this motorway section also connected Roanne to La Tour-de-Salvagny at the entry to Lyon, via Balbigny. The project cost €1.5 billion.

In September 2010, the Viaduc du Torranchin at Pontcharra-sur-Turdine was the first structure completed on this section. This 196-meter-long, 21.55-meter-wide structure, costing €11 million, was built by Eiffage Travaux Publics, Eiffel Construction Métallique and the Forézienne d'Entreprises.

In total, ten exceptional structures were built: seven viaducts, the most spectacular of which is the Viaduc de Goutte Vignole (618 meters), and three tunnels: Tunnel de Violay (3 900 m), tunnel of La Bussière ( 1,050 m) and the Chalosset tunnel (750 m). The A89 has 2 × 3 lanes of 5 km on each side of the Tunnel de Violay.

This section, however, was included in the national master plan for infrastructure in the 1970s, before being abandoned in 1975 following the oil crisis. The section, crossing the sectors of the lower valley of the Azergues and Beaujolais, were contested by the agricultural areas and by a strong urban area (near Villefranche-sur-Saône). Despite the refusal by the associations, including a coordinating committee against the highway in Beaujolais (3CAB), which preferred the development of a national road with 2 × 2 lanes, the preliminary design studies summary still took place in 1997. The public inquiry was launched in June 1997 and the commission of inquiry gave a favorable opinion for the realisation of this section of highway. The procedure, leading to a declaration for public use, was not pursued according to a press release of 5 January 1999, following environmental difficulties as contained in the CIADT of 15 December 1998. The project then cost 11 billion francs. Twenty residents associations were formed against this highway between 1987 and 1995. This section, up to La Tour-de-Salvagny, was declared a public utility on 17 April 2003. The section was inaugurated on 19 January 2013 and opened two days later.

Section between the A20 and Saint-Germain-les-Vergnes
A press release from the Corrèze Prefecture, dated 15 May 2006, confirmed the extension of the A89, north of Brive-la-Gaillarde, by 2 × 2 lanes of the D9 by 2012–2013 to A20 with a possible 2 × 3 lanes depending on the future road traffic. This meant the definitive abandonment of the stretch between Saint-Germain-les-Vergnes and Brive-Nord, which cosigned with the A20.

The 4.5 km section was inaugurated on 7 February 2015 by François Hollande, President of the Republic, and put into service on 17 April 2015.

Section between La Tour-de-Salvagny and Limonest
On 4 April 2016, the work to construct the A89 link at La Tour-de-Salvagny with the A6 at Limonest began. This section opened on 3 March 2018, ensuring continuity with not only the A6 but also the A46 via the A466 motorway.

Municipal councilors, associations, the Urban Community of Lyon chaired by Gérard Collomb, the Rhône Department and other organizations opposed this connection by proposing an alternative to Anse/Quincieux (A46N), which would have reduced the traffic from the A89 on the already saturated Tunnel de Fourvière.

Planned sections
 Remodeling the interchange with the A630 Bordeaux ring road (Rocade).
 Upgrade of the highway status of the N89 between Bordeaux and Libourne.
 Offshoot of Saint-Beauzire (A71 - A89 link for the northern bypass of Clermont-Ferrand) - 7 km

Route

Completed sections

 Antenne de Balbigny
 Combronde-Saint-Julien-Puy-Lavèze-Ussel-Tulle-Saint-Germain-les-Vergnes
 Brive-Terrasson-Lavilledieu
 Thenon-Périgueux-Libourne
 Balbigny-Thiers-Clermont-Ferrand: Parc de l'image.
 Combronde-Clermont-Ferrand the road merges with the A71 autoroute.

Junctions

A711 and A710 to A72 
This will be a re-numbering of part of the existing A72 autoroute.

Exchange A711-A710-A89 A junction with the A711 and A710 and the A89.
Rest Area: Branchilion/Pacages
01 (Lezoux) km 12 Towns served: Lezoux
Rest Area: Limagne
02 (Thiers-Ouest) km 23 Towns served: Thiers
Rest Area: Les Pins/Le Lac
03 (Thiers-Est) km 33 Towns served: Thiers
Rest Area: Les Suchères
04 (Noirétable) km 47 Towns served: Noirétable
Service Area: Haut-Forez
05 (Saint-Germain-Laval) km 69 Towns served: Saint-Germain-Laval
Rest Area: Les Bruyères/Les Ardilliers
Exchange A72-A89 Junction with the A72 and A89.

A71 to A20 

Exchange A71-A89 Junction of the A71 and the A89. Towns served: Combronde
27: Towns served: Manzat
Rest Area: Manzat
26: Towns served: Pontgibaud
25 (La Bourboule) Towns served: Rochefort-Montagne, Laqueuille, La Bourboule and Bourg-Lastic
Rest Area: Chavanon
24 (Ussel-Est) Towns served: Ussel and Bort-les-Orgues
Rest Area: La Loutre
23 (Ussel-Ouest) Towns served: Ussel, Neuvic, Bort-les-Orgues and Mauriac
22 (Égletons) Towns served: Égletons
Service Area: La Moyenne Corrèze
21 (Tulle-Est) Towns served: Tulle and Gimel-les-Cascades
20 (Tulle-Nord) Towns served: Tulle and Uzerche
19.1 (Saint-Germain-les-Vergnes) Towns served: Saint-Germain-les-Vergnes
Exchange A20-A89 Junction of the A20 and A89

A20 to Bordeaux

Exchange A20-A89 Junction with A20 and A89
18 (Terrasson) Towns served: Terrasson-Lavilledieu
Exchange RN89-A89 Junction with the RN89 as a temporary end to the autoroute.
Exchange RN89-A89 Junction with the RN89 as a temporary start to the autoroute.
17 (Thenon) Towns served: Thenon
16 (Périgueux-Est) Towns served: Périgueux
Service Area: Le Manoire
15 (Périgueux-Centre) Towns served: Périgueux
14 (Périgueux-Ouest) Towns served: Périgueux
13.1 (Mussidan) Towns served: Mussidan
13 (Mussidan-Centre) Towns served: Mussidan and Bergerac
12 (Montpon-Ménestérol) Towns served: Montpon-Ménestérol and Sainte-Foy-la-Grande
Service Area: La Palombières
11 (Coutras) Towns served: Coutras
Rest Area: Les Vignes
10 (Libourne-Nord) Towns served: Libourne
09 (Libourne-Sud) Towns served: Libourne
Exchange RN89-A89 Junction with the RN89 which the A89 merges.
08 Towns served: Vayres
07 Towns served: Vayres
06 Towns served: Beychac-et-Caillau
05 Towns served: Beychac-et-Caillau
04 Towns served: Beychac-et-Caillau
03 Towns served: Montussan
02.2 Towns served: Montussan
02.1 Towns served: Yvrac
02 Towns served: Yvrac
01 Towns served: Bordeaux
Exchange A630-RN89 Junction of the RN89 with the A630 to Bordeaux.

External links
 A89 Motorway in Saratlas

References

A89